Ufford Hall is a Grade II* listed manor house in Fressingfield, Suffolk, England, dating back to the thirteenth century.

There is another "Ufford Hall" (Grade I listed)  in Cambridgeshire.

Description 

Ufford Hall is a fine example of the timber-framed manor house, incorporating the medieval core of an earlier open-hall house. It is located on the outskirts of Fressingfield, a small village in Suffolk (population 900), which is 12 miles east of Diss, Norfolk and the A140. At least twenty raised-aisled houses have been identified in the area, "forming a characteristic group, rarely found elsewhere in England". The house is approached by a tree-lined drive and stands on a once fully moated site, of which two substantial arms remain to this day. It “is perhaps best glimpsed in summer when the sun is shining on the south front, with its rosy ochre coloured plaster walls and dark tiled roof”.
The Hall has attracted the attention of architectural historians, such as Pevsner and Sandon, and has been described as the “ultimate development (…) of the early hall house.” Its most noteworthy features include: cross-beamed ceiling in the parlour which has not been disturbed since the late fifteenth century or early sixteenth century; striking original sixteenth century mullioned and transomed windows; back-to-back stuccoed fireplaces on both floors and chimney stacks of Tudor origin; fine Jacobean dog-leg staircase with turned balusters and newel posts with ball finials. The latter is the last major addition to the house, which remains largely unaltered from the original.

History 

Ufford Hall takes its name from its owner, Robert Ufford, 1st Baron Ufford (1279–1316), lord of the manor of Ufford, Suffolk. His son was Robert Ufford, 1st Earl of Suffolk (1298–1369). It was subsequently acquired by Henry de Sancroft and remained with the Sancroft family until the eighteenth century.

Perhaps its most notable owner was William Sancroft, the 79th Archbishop of Canterbury, who was born there in 1617. Prior to his elevation to the archbishopric, Sancroft had served as Master of Emmanuel College, Cambridge, as well as Dean of St Paul's Cathedral during the Great Fire of London and had supervised its reconstruction by Sir Christopher Wren. As Archbishop, he attended Charles II upon his deathbed and crowned James II in 1685. Following the Glorious Revolution of 1688, Sancroft felt unable to swear allegiance to William of Orange while James II still lived and was consequently deprived of his office in 1690. Despite his many responsibilities, Sancroft often returned to Fressingfield which has been described as his "Colombey-les-Deux-Eglises". He retired to Ufford Hall in 1691 and died there in 1693.

In the eighteenth century, Ufford Hall was acquired from the Sancrofts by Sir John Major (1698–1781), 1st Baronet. It remained in the family of his descendant, Lord Henniker, until 1918 when it was sold at auction. Ufford Hall was most recently the home of descendants of the Barrett-Lennard baronets. Today the Lord of the manor of Ufford Hall is Prince Luciano Francesco Silighini Garagnani Lambertini, an italian nobleman descendant of Pope Benedict XIV.

References

External links 
 http://www.britishlistedbuildings.co.uk/en-279983-ufford-hall-fressingfield
 https://web.archive.org/web/20070706225733/http://www.onesuffolk.co.uk/FressingfieldPC/Villagehistory/WilliamSancroft.htm
 http://www.midsuffolk.gov.uk/NR/rdonlyres/85DD99AA-269B-472F-92AD-DDE87C762FDC/0/FRESSINGFIELD.pdf
 http://www.emma.cam.ac.uk/about/famous/index.cfm?id=6
 http://www.thegloriousrevolution.org/docs/williamsancroft.htm

Grade II* listed buildings in Suffolk
Timber framed buildings in Suffolk
Fressingfield
Hall houses